This article lists mathematical properties and laws of sets, involving the set-theoretic operations of union, intersection, and complementation and the relations of set equality and set inclusion. It also provides systematic procedures for evaluating expressions, and performing calculations, involving these operations and relations.

The binary operations of set union and intersection satisfy many identities. Several of these identities or "laws" have well established names.

Notation

If it is needed then unless indicated otherwise, it should be assumed that  denotes the universe set, which means that all sets that are used in the formula are subsets of  

Typically, the set  will denote the eft most set,  the iddle set, and  the ight most set. 

For sets  and  define:

and

If  is a set that is understood (say from context, or because it is clearly stated) to be a subset of some other set  then the complement of a set  may be denoted by:

The definition of  may depend on context.

Finitely many sets

One subset involved

Assume 

Identity:

Definition:  is called a left identity element of a binary operator  if  for all  and it is called a right identity element of  if  for all  A left identity element that is also a right identity element if called an identity element.

The empty set  is an identity element of binary union  and symmetric difference  and it is also a right identity element of set subtraction  

but  is not a left identity element of  since
 
so  if and only if 

Idempotence  and Nilpotence :

Domination/Zero element:

but 
 
so 

Double complement or involution law:

Two sets involved

Assume both  are subsets of some universe set

Formulas for binary set operations ⋂, ⋃, \, and ∆

Whenever necessary, both  should be assumed to be subsets of some universe set  so that

De Morgan's laws

De Morgan's laws state that for

Commutativity

Unions, intersection, and symmetric difference are commutative operations:

Set subtraction is not commutative. However, the commutativity of set subtraction can be characterized: from  it follows that:
 
Said differently, if distinct symbols always represented distinct sets, then the  true formulas of the form  that could be written would be those involving a single symbol; that is, those of the form:  
But such formulas are necessarily true for  binary operation  (because  must hold by definition of equality), and so in this sense, set subtraction is as diametrically opposite to being commutative as is possible for a binary operation. 
Set subtraction is also neither left alternative nor right alternative; instead,  if and only if  if and only if  
Set subtraction is quasi-commutative and satisfies the Jordan identity.

Other identities involving two sets

Absorption laws:

Other properties

Intervals:

Subsets ⊆ and supersets ⊇

The following statements are equivalent for any 
 (that is)

The following statements are equivalent for any 
There exists some

Set equality

The following statements are equivalent:

If  then  if and only if 
Uniqueness of complements: If  then

Empty set

A set  is empty if the sentence  is true, where the notation  is shorthand for  

If  is any set then the following are equivalent:
 is not empty, meaning that the sentence  is true (literally, the logical negation of " is empty" holds true).
(In classical mathematics)  is inhabited, meaning: 
 In constructive mathematics, "not empty" and "inhabited" are not equivalent: every inhabited set is not empty but the converse is not always guaranteed; that is, in constructive mathematics, a set  that is not empty (where by definition, " is empty" means that the statement  is true) might not have an inhabitant (which is an  such that ).
 for some set 

If  is any set then the following are equivalent:
 is empty, meaning: 
 for every set 
 for every set 
 for some/every set 

Given any  

Moreover,

Meets, Joins, and lattice properties

Inclusion is a partial order: 
Explicitly, this means that inclusion  which is a binary operation, has the following three properties:
Reflexivity: 
Antisymmetry: 
Transitivity: 

The following proposition says that for any set  the power set of  ordered by inclusion, is a bounded lattice, and hence together with the distributive and complement laws above, show that it is a Boolean algebra.

Existence of a least element and a greatest element: 

Joins/supremums exist: 

if  is a set such that  and  then 

Meets/infimums exist: 

if  is a set such that  and  then 

Other inclusion properties:

If  then 
If  and  then

Three sets involved

Precedence rules

There is no universal agreement on the order of precedence of the basic set operators.
Nevertheless, many authors use precedence rules for set operators, although these rules vary with the author. 

One common convention is to associate intersection  with logical conjunction (and)  and associate union  with logical disjunction (or)  and then transfer the precedence of these logical operators (where  has precedence over ) to these set operators, thereby giving  precedence over  
So for example,  would mean  since it would be associated with the logical statement  and similarly,  would mean  since it would be associated with  

Sometimes, set complement (subtraction)  is also associated with logical complement (not)  in which case it will have the highest precedence. 
More specifically,  is rewritten  so that for example,  would mean  since it would be rewritten as the logical statement  which is equal to 
However, because set subtraction is not associative  a formula such as  would be ambiguous; for this reason, among others, set subtraction is often not assigned any precedence at all. 

Symmetric difference  is sometimes associated with exclusive or (xor)  (also sometimes denoted by ), in which case if the order of precedence from highest to lowest is  then the order of precedence (from highest to lowest) for the set operators would be  
There is no universal agreement on the precedence of exclusive disjunction  with respect to the other logical connectives, which is why symmetric difference  is not often assigned a precedence.

Associativity

Definition: A binary operator  is called associative if  always holds. 

The following set operators are associative:

For set subtraction, instead of associativity, only the following is always guaranteed:

where equality holds if and only if  (this condition does not depend on ). Thus 
 if and only if  
where the only difference between the left and right hand side set equalities is that the locations of  have been swapped.

Distributivity

Definition: If  are binary operators then  if 
while  if  
The operator  if it both left distributes and right distributes over  
In the definitions above, to transform one side to the other, the innermost operator (the operator inside the parentheses) becomes the outermost operator and the outermost operator becomes the innermost operator.

Right distributivity:

Left distributivity:

Distributivity and symmetric difference ∆

Intersection distributes over symmetric difference:

Union does not distribute over symmetric difference because only the following is guaranteed in general:

Symmetric difference does not distribute over itself:

Distributivity and set subtraction \

Failure of set subtraction to left distribute:

Set subtraction is  distributive over itself. However, set subtraction is  left distributive over itself because only the following is guaranteed in general:

where equality holds if and only if  which happens if and only if  

So these two sets are equal if and only if they are both equal to  
Moreover,  if and only if  

To investigate the left distributivity of set subtraction over unions or intersections, consider how the sets involved in (both of) De Morgan's laws are all related:

always holds in general but equality is not guaranteed. 
Equality holds if and only if  which happens if and only if  

where equality holds for one (or equivalently, for both) of the above two inclusion formulas if and only if  

The following statements are equivalent:

 and 

Quasi-commutativity: 

always holds but in general, 

However,  if and only if  if and only if  

Set subtraction complexity: To manage the many identities involving set subtraction, this section is divided based on where the set subtraction operation and parentheses are located on the left hand side of the identity.

Two set subtractions

Set subtraction is  associative in general: 

since only the following is always guaranteed:

(L\M)\R

L\(M\R) 

 If 
  with equality if and only if

One set subtraction

(L\M) ⁎ R 

Set subtraction on the left, and parentheses on the

L\(M ⁎ R) 

Set subtraction on the left, and parentheses on the 

where the above two sets that are the subjects of De Morgan's laws always satisfy

(L ⁎ M)\R 

Set subtraction on the right, and parentheses on the

L ⁎ (M\R) 

Set subtraction on the right, and parentheses on the

Three operations on three sets

(L • M) ⁎ (M • R) 

Operations of the form :

(L • M) ⁎ (R\M) 

Operations of the form :

(L\M) ⁎ (L\R) 

Operations of the form :

Other simplifications

Other properties:

 

If  then 

If  then 

Cartesian products ⨯ of finitely many sets

Binary ⋂ of finite ⨯

Binary ⋃ of finite ⨯

Difference \ of finite ⨯

and

Finite ⨯ of differences \

Symmetric difference ∆ and finite ⨯

In general,  need not be a subset nor a superset of

Arbitrary families of sets

Let   and  be indexed families of sets.

Definitions

A  or (more briefly) a  refers to a set whose elements are sets. 

An  is a function from some set, called its , into some family of sets. 
An indexed family of sets will be denoted by  where this notation assigns the symbol  for the indexing set and for every index  assigns the symbol  to the value of the function at  
The function itself may then be denoted by the symbol  which is obtained from the notation  by replacing the index  with a bullet symbol  explicitly,  is the function:

which may be summarized by writing  

Any given indexed family of sets  (which is a function) can be canonically associated with its image/range  (which is a family of sets). 
Conversely, any given family of sets  may be associated with the -indexed family of sets  which is technically the identity map  
However, this is  a bijective correspondence because an indexed family of sets  is  required to be injective (that is, there may exist distinct indices  such as ), which in particular means that it is possible for distinct indexed families of sets (which are functions) to be associated with the same family of sets (by having the same image/range). 

Arbitrary unions defined

If  is a family of sets then  denotes the set: 

Arbitrary intersections defined

If  then

If  is a  family of sets then  denotes the set: 

Nullary intersections

If  then

where every possible thing  in the universe vacuously satisfied the condition: "if  then ".

So if  and:
if you are working in a model in which there exists some universe   then  

Assumption: Henceforth, whenever a formula requires some indexing set to be non-empty in order for an arbitrary intersection to be well-defined, then this will automatically be assumed without mention. 

A consequence of this is the following assumption/definition:

A  of sets or an  refers to the intersection of a finite collection of  sets. 

Some authors adopt the so called , which is the convention that an empty intersection of sets is equal to some canonical set. In particular, if all sets are subsets of some set  then some author may declare that the empty intersection of these sets be equal to  However, the nullary intersection convention is not as commonly accepted as the nullary union convention and this article will not adopt it (this is due to the fact that unlike the empty union, the value of the empty intersection depends on  so if there are multiple sets under consideration, which is commonly the case, then the value of the empty intersection risks becoming ambiguous).

Multiple index sets

Distributing unions and intersections

Binary ⋂ of arbitrary ⋃'s

and

 If all  are pairwise disjoint and all  are also pairwise disjoint, then so are all  (that is, if  then ).

 Importantly, if  then in general,  (an example of this is given below).
 : Let  and let  Let  and let  Then  Furthermore,

Binary ⋃ of arbitrary ⋂'s

and

 Importantly, if  then in general,  (an example of this is given above).  The single intersection on the right hand side  be over all pairs

Arbitrary ⋂'s and arbitrary ⋃'s

Incorrectly distributing by swapping ⋂ and ⋃
Naively swapping  and  may produce a different set

The following inclusion always holds:

In general, equality need not hold and moreover, the right hand side depends on how for each fixed  the sets  are labelled; and analogously, the left hand side depends on how for each fixed  the sets  are labelled. An example demonstrating this is now given.

 
In particular, the left hand side is no longer  which shows that the left hand side  depends on how the sets are labelled. 

Correct distributive laws

Suppose that for each   is a non-empty index set and for each  let  be any set (for example, to apply this law to  use  for all  and use  for all  and all ). Let
 
Then 

where

Applying the distributive laws

which when combined with  implies: 

where 

Recall that  was  
  
Expanding and simplifying the left hand side gives

and doing the same to the right hand side gives:

Thus the general identity  reduces down to the previously given set equality :

Distributing subtraction over ⋃ and ⋂

The next identities are known as De Morgan's laws.

In general, naively swapping  and  may produce a different set (see this note for more details). 
The equalities 
 

Commutativity and associativity of ⋃ and ⋂

Commutativity:

Unions of unions and intersections of intersections:

and

and if  then also:

Cartesian products Π of arbitrarily many sets

Intersections ⋂ of Π

If  is a family of sets then 

So for instance, 

 and 

Intersections of products indexed by different sets

Let  and  be two families indexed by different sets. 

Technically,  implies  
However, sometimes these products are somehow identified as the same set through some bijection or one of these products is identified as a subset of the other via some injective map, in which case (by abuse of notation) this intersection may be equal to some other (possibly non-empty) set. 

Unions ⋃ of Π

For unions, only the following is guaranteed in general:

where  is a family of sets. 

However,

Difference \ of Π

so for instance,

and

Symmetric difference ∆ of Π

Functions and sets

Let  be any function. 

Let  be completely arbitrary sets. Assume

Definitions

Images and preimages of sets

Saturated sets

A set  is said to be  or a  if any of the following equivalent conditions are satisfied: 
There exists a set  such that 
 Any such set  necessarily contains  as a subset.

 and 
 The inclusion  always holds, where if  then this becomes 
For a set  to be -saturated, it is necessary that  

Compositions and restrictions of functions

with domain and codomain
 
defined by

with  defined by sending  to  that is, 
 
Alternatively,  where  denotes the inclusion map, which is defined by

(Pre)Images of arbitrary unions ⋃'s and intersections ⋂'s

If  is a family of arbitrary sets indexed by  then:

So of these four identities, it is   that are not always preserved. Preimages preserve all basic set operations. Unions are preserved by both images and preimages. 

If all  are -saturated then  be will be -saturated and equality will hold in the first relation above; explicitly, this means: 

(Pre)Images of binary set operations

Throughout, let  and  be any sets and let  be any function.

Summary

Preimages preserve set operations

Preimages of sets are well-behaved with respect to all basic set operations:

In words, preimages distribute over unions, intersections, set subtraction, and symmetric difference. 

Images  preserve unions

Images of unions are well-behaved:

but images of the other basic set operations are  since only the following are guaranteed in general:

In words, images distribute over unions but not necessarily over intersections, set subtraction, or symmetric difference. 

In general, equality is not guaranteed for images of set subtraction  nor for images of the other two elementary set operators that can be defined as the difference of two sets:
 

If  then  where as in the more general case, equality is not guaranteed. If  is surjective then  which can be rewritten as:  if  and

Counter-examples: images of operations not distributing

If  is constant,  and  then all four of the set containments

are strict/proper (that is, the sets are not equal) since one side is the empty set while the other is non-empty. Thus equality is not guaranteed for even the simplest of functions. 
The example above is now generalized to show that these four set equalities can fail for any constant function whose domain contains at least two (distinct) points. 

The containment  is strict: 
In words: functions might not distribute over set subtraction  
The containment  is strict: 
The containment  is strict: 
In words: functions might not distribute over symmetric difference  (which can be defined as the set subtraction of two sets).
The containment  is strict: 
In words: functions might not distribute over set intersection  (which can be defined as the set subtraction of two sets).

What the set operations in these four examples have in common is that they either  set subtraction  (examples (1) and (2)) or else they can naturally  as the set subtraction of two sets (examples (3) and (4)).

Mnemonic: In fact, for each of the above four set formulas for which equality is not guaranteed, the direction of the containment (that is, whether to use ) can always be deduced by imagining the function  as being  and the two sets ( and ) as being non-empty disjoint subsets of its domain. This is because  equality fails for such a function and sets: one side will be always be  and the other non-empty − from this fact, the correct choice of  can be deduced by answering: "which side is empty?"

should be  pretend 

true. 

Furthermore, this mnemonic can also be used to correctly deduce whether or not a set operation always distribute over images or preimages; for example, to determine whether or not  always equals  or alternatively, whether or not  always equals  (although  was used here, it can replaced by ). The answer to such a question can, as before, be deduced by consideration of this constant function: the answer for the general case (that is, for arbitrary  and ) is always the same as the answer for this choice of (constant) function and disjoint non-empty sets.

Conditions guaranteeing that images distribute over set operations

Characterizations of when equality holds for  sets:

For any function  the following statements are equivalent:
 is injective. 
 This means:  for all distinct 
 (The equals sign  can be replaced with ).
 (The equals sign  can be replaced with ).
 (The equals sign  can be replaced with ).
 (The equals sign  can be replaced with ).
Any one of the four statements (b) - (e) but with the words "for all" replaced with any one of the following:
"for all singleton subsets"
 In particular, the statement that results from (d) gives a characterization of injectivity that explicitly involves only one point (rather than two):  is injective if and only if 
"for all disjoint singleton subsets"
 For statement (d), this is the same as: "for all singleton subsets" (because the definition of "pairwise disjoint" is satisfies vacuously by any family that consists of exactly 1 set).
"for all disjoint subsets"

In particular, if a map is not known to be injective then barring additional information, there is no guarantee that any of the equalities in statements (b) - (e) hold.

An example above can be used to help prove this characterization. Indeed, comparison of that example with such a proof suggests that the example is representative of the fundamental reason why one of these four equalities in statements (b) - (e) might not hold (that is, representative of "what goes wrong" when a set equality does not hold).

Conditions for f(L⋂R) = f(L)⋂f(R)

Characterizations of equality: The following statements are equivalent:

If  satisfies  then 
If  but  then 

Any of the above three conditions (i) - (k) but with the subset symbol  replaced with an equals sign 

Sufficient conditions for equality: Equality holds if any of the following are true:
 is injective.
The restriction  is injective.

 is -saturated; that is, 
 is -saturated; that is, 

 or equivalently, 
 or equivalently, 
 or equivalently, 

In addition, the following always hold:

Conditions for f(L\R) = f(L)\f(R)

Characterizations of equality: The following statements are equivalent:
Whenever  then 
 The set on the right hand side is always equal to 
 This is the above condition (f) but with the subset symbol  replaced with an equals sign 

Necessary conditions for equality (excluding characterizations):  If equality holds then the following are necessarily true:
 or equivalently 
 or equivalently, 

Sufficient conditions for equality: Equality holds if any of the following are true:
 is injective.
The restriction  is injective.
 or equivalently, 
 is -saturated; that is, 
 or equivalently,

Conditions for f(X\R) = f(X)\f(R)

Characterizations of equality: The following statements are equivalent:
 is -saturated.
Whenever  then 
   where if  then this list can be extended to include:
 is -saturated; that is, 

Sufficient conditions for equality:  Equality holds if any of the following are true:
 is injective.
 is -saturated; that is,

Conditions for f(L∆R) = f(L)∆f(R)

Characterizations of equality: The following statements are equivalent:
  and  
  and  
  and  
 The inclusions  and  always hold.
 If this above set equality holds, then this set will also be equal to both  and 
  and  

Necessary conditions for equality (excluding characterizations): If equality holds then the following are necessarily true:
 or equivalently 

Sufficient conditions for equality: Equality holds if any of the following are true:
 is injective.
The restriction  is injective.

Exact formulas/equalities for images of set operations

Formulas for f(L\R) =

For any function  and any sets  and

Formulas for f(X\R) =

Taking  in the above formulas gives:

where the set  is equal to the image under  of the largest -saturated subset of 
In general, only  always holds and equality is not guaranteed; but replacing "" with its subset "" results in a formula in which equality is  guaranteed: 
 
From this it follows that: 

Formulas for f(L∆R) =

Formulas for f(L) =

It follows from the above formulas for the image of a set subtraction that for any function  and any set 

This is more easily seen as being a consequence of the fact that for any   if and only if

Formulas for f(L⋂R) =

It follows from the above formulas for the image of a set that for any function  and any sets  and 

where moreover, for any  
 if and only if  if and only if  if and only if 

(Pre)Images of set operations on (pre)images

Let  and  be arbitrary sets,  be any map, and let  and  

(Pre)Images of operations on images

Since 

Since 

Using  this becomes  and

and so

(Pre)Images and Cartesian products Π

Let  and for every  let 
 
denote the canonical projection onto  

Definitions

Given a collection of maps  indexed by  define the map

which is also denoted by  This is the unique map satisfying 
 

Conversely, if given a map  then 
Explicitly, what this means is that if 
 
is defined for every  then  the unique map satisfying:  for all  or said more briefly, 

The map  should not be confused with the Cartesian product  of these maps, which is by definition is the map 

with domain  rather than 

Preimage and images of a Cartesian product

Suppose  

If  then
 

If  then 
 
where equality will hold if  in which case  and 

For equality to hold, it suffices for there to exist a family  of subsets  such that  in which case: 

(Pre)Image of a single set

Containments ⊆ and intersections ⋂ of images and preimages

Equivalences and implications of images and preimages

Intersection of a set and a (pre)image

The following statements are equivalent:

Thus for any

Sequences and collections of families of sets

Definitions

A  is a family of subsets of  

The  of a set  is the set of all subsets of : 

Notation for sequences of sets

where  denotes the natural numbers. 

Disjoint and monotone sequences of sets

A sequence or net  of set is called  or  if (resp.  or ) if for all indices   (resp. ). 
A sequence or net  of set is called  (resp. ) if it is non-decreasing (resp. is non-increasing) and also  for all  indices  
It is called  if it is non-decreasing or non-increasing and it is called  if it is strictly increasing or strictly decreasing. 

Definitions of elementwise operations on families

If  are families of sets and if  is any set then define:  

These elementwise operations on families of sets play an important role in, among other subjects, the theory of filters and prefilters on sets. 

The  of a family  is the family: 
 

Definitions of categories of families of sets

A family  is called  if 

A family  is said to be: 
  (resp. ) if whenever  then  (respectively). 
  (resp. ) if whenever  are elements of  then so is their intersections  (resp. so is their union ). 
  (or )  if whenever  then  

A family  of sets is called a/an: 
  and is said to have  if  and  
  is a non-empty family of subsets of  that contains the empty set, forms a −system, and is also closed under complementation with respect to  
  is an algebra on  that is closed under countable unions (or equivalently, closed under countable intersections).

Sequences of sets often arise in measure theory.

Algebra of sets

The article on this topic lists set identities and other relationships these three operations.

Every algebra of sets is also a ring of sets and a π-system. 

Algebra generated by a family of sets

Given any family  of subsets of  there is a unique smallest algebra of sets in  containing  
It is called  and it will be denote it by  
This algebra can be constructed as follows:

If  then  and we are done.
Let  be the family of all sets in  together with their complements (taken in ).
Let  be the family of all possible finite intersections of sets in 

Elementwise operations on families

Let  and  be families of sets over  

Commutativity:  

Associativity:  

Identity:

Domination:

Power set

Sequences of sets

Ruppose that  is any set such that  for every index  
If  decreases to  then  increases to  
whereas if instead  increases to  then  decreases to  

If  are arbitrary sets and if  increases (resp. decreases) to  then  increase (resp. decreases) to

Partitions

Suppose that  is any sequence of sets, that  is any subset, and for every index  let  

See also

Notes

Notes

Proofs

Citations

References

 
 .
 
 Courant, Richard, Herbert Robbins, Ian Stewart, What is mathematics?: An Elementary Approach to Ideas and Methods, Oxford University Press US, 1996. . "SUPPLEMENT TO CHAPTER II THE ALGEBRA OF SETS".
  
  
  
  
  
 
  
 
  
  
  
 
  
  
  
"The Algebra of Sets", pp 16—23.

External links

 Operations on Sets at ProvenMath

Articles containing proofs
Basic concepts in infinite set theory
Basic concepts in set theory
Families of sets
Functions and mappings
Isomorphism theorems
Mathematical identities
Mathematics-related lists
Mathematical relations
Operations on sets
Set theory
Theorems in the foundations of mathematics